Psyllocarpus is a genus of flowering plants belonging to the family Rubiaceae. It is an endemic genus of Brazil found in Amazonia, Caatinga, and Cerrado. In 1979 the genus was revised by Kirkbride into two sections, Psyllocarpus sect. Psyllocarpus and P. sect Amazonica, based on geographic distribution and morphology.

Species 

Psyllocarpus sect. Psyllocarpus comprises P. asparagoides, P. bahiensis, P. goiasensis, P. laricoides, P. phyllocephalus, P. scatignae, P. schwackei. Psyllocarpus sect. Amazonica includes P. campinorum, P. cururuensis, P. psyllocarpoides. 

Psyllocarpus intermedius and Psyllocarpus densifolius are found in the same geographical region at sect. Psyllocarpus but are morphologically distinct. Carmo et al. (2021) recognized the monotypic genus Diadorimia to accommodate P. densifolius, while the determination of P. intermedius is pending further investigation.

References

Rubiaceae
Rubiaceae genera